In the mountaineering parlance of the Western United States, a fourteener is a mountain peak with an elevation of at least . The 96 fourteeners in the United States are all west of the Mississippi River. Colorado has the most (53) of any single state;  Alaska is second  with 29. Many peak baggers try to climb all fourteeners in the contiguous United States, one particular state, or another region.



Qualification criteria 
The summit of a mountain or hill may be measured in three principal ways:
Topographic elevation is the height of the summit above a geodetic sea level.
Topographic prominence is how high the summit rises above its surroundings.
Topographic isolation (or radius of dominance) is how far the summit lies from its nearest point of equal elevation.

Not all summits over 14,000 feet qualify as fourteeners. Summits that qualify are those considered by mountaineers to be independent. Objective standards for independence include topographic prominence and isolation (distance from a higher summit), or a combination of the two. However, fourteener lists do not always  use such objective rules consistently.

A rule commonly used by mountaineers in the contiguous United States is that a peak must have at least  of prominence to qualify. By this rule, Colorado has 53 fourteeners, California has 12, and Washington has two.

According to the Mountaineering Club of Alaska, the standard in Alaska uses a  prominence rule rather than a  rule.

Fourteeners

The following table lists the 96 mountain peaks of the United States with at least  of topographic elevation and at least  of topographic prominence].  Of these, 53 rise in Colorado, 29 in Alaska, 12 in California, and one in Washington (Liberty Cap is part of the crater atop Mt Rainier).  The 22 highest fourteeners all rise in Alaska.

Topographic prominence
The number of peaks included depends upon the minimum topographic prominence criterion. A criterion of  includes 90 peaks,  includes 77 peaks,  includes 63 peaks, and  includes 46 peaks.

The following U.S. summits have 14,000 ft of elevation, but have less than 300 ft of topographic prominence:
 Denali, Browne Tower, 14,530, Alaska: Prominence = . Why this became included on some fourteener lists is unclear.
 Mount Cameron, 14,238, Colorado: Prominence = 118 feet.
 El Diente Peak, 14,159, Colorado: Prominence = 239 feet. On many fourteener lists.
 Point Success, 14,158, Washington: Prominence = 118 feet.
 Polemonium Peak, 14,080+, California: Prominence = 160–240 feet.
 Starlight Peak, 14,080, California: Prominence = 80–160 feet.
 North Conundrum Peak, 14,040+, Colorado: Prominence = 200–280 feet.
 North Eolus, 14,039, Colorado: Prominence = 159–199 feet.
 North Maroon Peak, 14,014, Colorado: Prominence = 234 feet. On many fourteener lists.
 Thunderbolt Peak, 14,003, California: Prominence = 223 feet.
 Sunlight Spire, 14,001, Colorado: Prominence = 195–235 feet.

Gallery

See also

List of mountain peaks of North America
List of mountain peaks of Greenland
List of mountain peaks of Canada
List of mountain peaks of the Rocky Mountains
List of mountain peaks of the United States
List of the highest major summits of the United States
List of the major 4000-meter summits of the United States
List of the major 3000-meter summits of the United States
List of the most prominent summits of the United States
List of the ultra-prominent summits of the United States
List of the most isolated major summits of the United States
List of the major 100-kilometer summits of the United States
List of extreme summits of the United States
List of mountain peaks of Alaska
List of mountain peaks of California
List of mountain peaks of Colorado
List of mountain peaks of Hawaii
List of mountain peaks of Montana
List of mountain peaks of Nevada
List of mountain peaks of Utah
List of mountain peaks of Washington (state)
List of mountain peaks of Wyoming
List of mountain peaks of México
List of mountain peaks of Central America
List of mountain peaks of the Caribbean
United States of America
Geography of the United States
Geology of the United States
:Category:Mountains of the United States
commons:Category:Mountains of the United States
Physical geography
Eight-thousander, peak with at least 8,000 m. elevation

Notes

References

External links

United States Geological Survey (USGS)
Geographic Names Information System @ USGS
United States National Geodetic Survey (NGS)
Geodetic Glossary @ NGS
NGVD 29 to NAVD 88 online elevation converter @ NGS
Survey Marks and Datasheets @ NGS
Colorado 14ers on 14ers.com
Bivouac.com
Peakbagger.com
Peaklist.org
Peakware.com
Summitpost.org

Mountains of the United States
Fourteener
United States Fourteeners, List Of
Peak bagging in the United States
Colorado culture